Giuseppe Madonia (born 14 March 1983) is a retired Italian football player.

Club career
He made his Serie C debut for Trapani on 11 September 2011 in a game against Piacenza.

On 16 August 2018 he rejoined Serie D club Acireale. He left the club in the summer 2019 and then joined Cus Palermo on 27 September 2019. Madonia announced his retirement from football in March 2020.

References

External links
 

1983 births
Footballers from Palermo
Living people
Italian footballers
A.S.D. Giarre Calcio 1946 players
U.S. Pistoiese 1921 players
U.S. Vibonese Calcio players
Vigor Lamezia players
Trapani Calcio players
U.S. Catanzaro 1929 players
Matera Calcio players
S.S. Akragas Città dei Templi players
A.C.R. Messina players
Serie B players
Serie C players
Serie D players
Association football forwards
Virtus Francavilla Calcio players